Miss Singapore 1958, the first edition of Miss Universe Singapore pageant was held on 27 June 1958 at the Capitol Theatre, Singapore. Out of 32 applicants, it was then cut down to only 14 contestants to compete for the crown and title. A 19-year-old stenographer Marion Faulkner Willis won the title at the end of the event. She then had the rights to represent Singapore in the Miss Universe 1958 pageant in Long Beach, California, United States. She became the second woman to represent Singapore in the Miss Universe pageant after Marjorie Wee, of Malaya in 1954.

Result

Contestants 

 Milly Koh
 Doreen Blight
 Daisy Szeto
 Mary Wong
 Patricia Yong
 Leonie Koenits
 Shirley Vanderput
 Francis Foo
 Alice Yong
 Diana Hutchinson
 Irene De Silva
 Christi D'Cruz
 Pauline Szeto
 Marion Willis

References 

1958 in Singapore
1958 beauty pageants